Marc Duret (born 28 September 1957 in Nice, Alpes-Maritimes, France) is a French actor.

Having previously played Cardinal Guillaume Briçonnet in the television series Borgia from 2011 to 2014, Duret appeared as Joseph Duverney in the Starz series Outlander in 2016.

Duret was nominated for a 1991 César Award for Most Promising Actor for his portrayal of Rico in the 1990 film La Femme Nikita, and later nominated for a 1994 Molière Award for Best Newcomer for his theatre performance in Les grandes personnes (The Grown Ups). Screen Junkies named Duret #1 of its "10 Best French Movie Actors".

Education
Duret studied drama at the Conservatoire national in Nice, the Conservatoire national supérieur d'art dramatique in Paris, Rose Bruford College in London, and the University at Albany, SUNY and the Stella Adler Conservatory in New York.

Filmography

Film

Short film

Television

Theatre

Recognition

Screen Junkies named Duret #1 of its "10 Best French Movie Actors".

References

External links
 
 
 

1957 births
French male film actors
French male television actors
Living people
Male actors from Nice, France